Samir El-Mais (born 10 September 1980), nicknamed "Sweet Sammy", is an Abu Dhabi-born Canadian heavyweight boxer from Windsor, Ontario. Relatively unknown, El Mais captured the Canadian Heavyweight Championship on February 24, 2010 defeating Shavar Henry 9-4 in Halifax, Nova Scotia. He competed at the 2010 Commonwealth Games in the heavyweight division where he won his first bout against Kevin Evans of Wales and eventually lost in his quarter-final bout to Stephen Simmons of Scotland.

At the 2011 World Amateur Boxing Championships he defeated Yamil Peralta but had to pull out of his next fight. At the Olympic qualifier he beat Deivi Julio but lost the rematch with Peralta

References

1980 births
Living people
Heavyweight boxers
Commonwealth Games gold medallists for Canada
Boxers at the 2015 Pan American Games
Boxers at the 2014 Commonwealth Games
People from Abu Dhabi
Sportspeople from Windsor, Ontario
Canadian male boxers
Emirati emigrants to Canada
Pan American Games bronze medalists for Canada
Commonwealth Games medallists in boxing
Pan American Games medalists in boxing
Medalists at the 2015 Pan American Games
Medallists at the 2014 Commonwealth Games